Stephen Colbert Presents Tooning Out the News (TOTN) is an American live-action/animated satirical news television program created and executive produced by comedian and The Late Show host Stephen Colbert, Chris Licht, R. J. Fried and Tim Luecke. The series premiered on CBS All Access (now Paramount+) on April 7, 2020.

From August 18–20, 2020, the program covered the 2020 Democratic National Convention. It also covered the 2020 Republican National Convention from August 26–28, 2020. From November 1–3, 2020, the program also covered the 2020 United States presidential election. The first season ended on December 11, 2020.

In March 2021, it was announced that the series had been renewed for a second season starting with an exclusive half-hour special on March 4, 2021, which was followed by a full premiere on March 9, 2021. Season 2 added two new segments: "The Establishment with Tory Hughes" and "Smart Talk Tonight." On April 28, 2021, the program also covered the 2021 joint session of the United States Congress. On October 4, 2021, it was announced that the regular episodes would expand to a half-hour starting on October 8, 2021, and the series would switch to a weekly format. The second season ended on November 12, 2021.

On May 18, 2022, it was announced that the series would move to Comedy Central for a third season renewal consisting of 13 episodes, which premiered on October 5, 2022. On November 9, 2022, the program also covered the 2022 United States midterm elections. On February 7, 2023, it was announced that the third season was expanded with twelve additional episodes, including a special coverage based on the 2023 State of the Union Address.

Description 
Describing itself as an animated news program, Tooning Out the News combines live-action and animation and focuses on topical news satire form from real-life news stories as well as lampooning current events, political issues, media coverages, social commentaries, pop culture topics, and often uses self-reflexive humor.

The first season consisted of four main segments, "Big News with James Smartwood," "Inside The Hill," "Hot Take," and "Virtue Signal," which resemble shows seen on cable news channels, plus added interstitial vignettes covering other stories not mentioned in the main segments. Some interstitial vignettes are previewed on The Late Show. The second season added two new segments, "The Establishment with Tory Hughes" and "Smart Talk Tonight." Both "The Establishment with Tory Hughes" and the vignettes were dropped in the third season.

Three of the main segments originally debut on Paramount+ Tuesday through Thursday (the morning after a new The Late Show with Stephen Colbert episode), with the fourth, plus a compilation "Week in Review" show containing all four plus vignettes are released every Friday. Both regular episodes expanded to a half-hour, which was released every Friday starting on October 8, 2021, and the series would switch to a weekly format. The third season airs on Comedy Central every Wednesday, following after The Daily Show.

Cast and characters

Main 

 R.J. Fried as James Smartwood
 Maureen Monahan as Kylie Weaver/Sarah Sabo/Nicole Vance
 Jack Bensinger as Tyler Templeton
 Naima Pearce as Tory Hughes
 Ike Ufomadu as Dr. Ike Bloom
 Zach Smilovitz as James Smartwood Jr.
 Addison Anderson as Rich Ballard/Austin Sparks
 Sarah Caldwell as Eleanor Palmer 
 Jeremy Bent as Teddy Hopper/Jonathan Keene

Recurring 

 Laurel Zoff Pelon as Bonnie Davis
 Keisha Zollar as Susan Shephard
 Neil D'Astolfo as Peter Womack/Troy Lawson
 Alise Morales as Lila Moreno
 Nathan Min as Brian Min
 Otter Lee as Otter Lin
 Kennedy Baldwin as Morgan Herbert Walker
 Graham Techler as Kenneth Parsons
 Moujan Zolfaghari as Catherine Nadaan
 Niccole Thurman
 Steph Cook as Charlotte Fitzgerald
 Allison Reese as Lydia Parker
 Ritchie Moriarty as Ted Jaworski 
 Jeremy Levick as Jeremy Levy-Levin
 Rajat Suresh as Rajat Mehta
 Mitch Lewis as Announcer

Episodes

History 
The series was set to premiere on March 16, 2020, but production was delayed due to the COVID-19 pandemic. The series debuted on April 7, 2020, instead, after production continued via remote work, with animators and showrunner RJ Fried, who has also produced The Late Show and Showtime animated series Our Cartoon President, working via Zoom and Slack.

Tooning Out The News received mainstream critical acclaim and has recently gained mixed to positive reviews from critics. The series also has been nominated for numerous awards, including a Critics' Choice Award for Best Short Form Series, a Producers Guild of America Awards for Outstanding Short-Form Program, a Writers Guild of America Award for Television: Comedy-Variety Talk Series and two Primetime Emmy Award for Outstanding Short Form Comedy, Drama or Variety Series, but eventually lost to Carpool Karaoke: The Series. It was also won Technical Achievement Video at 2022 Webby People's Voice Award.

On October 4, 2021, it was announced that the regular episodes would expand to a half-hour starting on October 8, 2021, and the series would switch to a weekly format.

On March 29, 2022, co-creators and co-executive producers Mike Leech and Zach Smilovitz have renewed their overall deal at CBS Studios, originally signed in 2020, where they will continue to write and produce across all platforms. On May 18, 2022, it was announced that the series would move to Comedy Central as part of its adult animation push. Paramount+ will still simultaneously serve as its streaming home.

On July 23, 2022, senior researcher Jonathan van Halem was offered the role of News Producer, making him the first person of Dutch descent to hold the 
position in the show's three-season history.

On September 29, 2022, the animation staff at Tooning Out the News publicly voted to join a union with The Animation Guild, IATSE Local 839, making them the first group of animation workers and production staff in New York to vote in favor of unionizing. At the same time, the guild is generally submitting a letter for voluntary recognition to CBS Eye Animation Productions, an animation studio division of CBS Studios.

Production 
The concept of the show inspired by an idea to parody the popular cable news format took shape with short clips featuring animated cartoon pundits on The Late Show, where animated anchors are interviewed with a range of guests while working on a parallel track to produce the week’s segments. Originally, the show's production used motion capture to "record" the actors' performances on the show, after converting David Letterman's old personal screening room at the Ed Sullivan Theater as a control room.

After the pandemic forced animators to work from home, they switched to remote production, shipping equipment to animator's houses and using Adobe Character Animator software to animate the show's virtual hosts, which allow guests to interact with the show’s animated hosts and panelists in real-time. While the series usually takes months to produce, an episode of Tooning Out the News is turned around a few days before airtime for the concept to stay current, with the topical productions and real-time animation works done remotely.

The pandemic also forced producers to find a remote solution for guests, who were set to be filmed in the studio. Because the show's back-and-forth banter required low latency, producers partnered with The Video Call Center to handle the acquisition and quality control of guest connections. The VCC developed a custom process that enables the show’s animated hosts and correspondents to have topical, live, natural conversations with newsmakers and journalists.

Marketing 
From October 9–10, 2020, the hosts from Tooning Out The News made their appearance at 2020 Just for Laughs Comedy Festival. In February 2021, James Smartwood made his appearance in a marketing campaign for Super Bowl LV commercial to promote ViacomCBS' launch of the rebranded streaming service Paramount+. On July 23, 2021, the hosts from Tooning Out The News also made their appearance along with a special coverage to promote the series during Paramount+'s "Peak Animation" panel at 2021 Comic-Con@Home.

Notable guests 

The show features interviews with newsmakers, journalists, analysts, politicians, activists, and celebrities, including:

 Aasif Mandvi
 A. B. Stoddard
 Adam Schiff
 Al Sharpton
 Alan Dershowitz
 Alex Gibney
 Alex Jones
 Alex Wagner
 Alyssa Milano
 André Carson
 Andrew Ross Sorkin
 Andy Slavitt
 Anthony Mason
 Anthony Scaramucci
 Barbara Lee
 Barry Sonnenfeld
 Ben Rhodes
 Ben Smith
 Bill Kristol
 Bob Woodward
 Bomani Jones
 Brian Stelter
 Carol D. Leonnig
 Cecile Richards
 Charlamagne tha God
 Charles M. Blow
 Chasten Buttigieg
 Chris Hadfield
 Chris Murphy
 Clarence Page
 Clarissa Ward
 Cori Bush
 Cory Booker
 Cornel West
 Cornell Belcher
 Craig Fugate
 Cullen Hoback
 Dan Abrams
 Darren Soto
 David Gregory
 David Ignatius
 David Remnick
 Dean Cain
 Deepak Chopra
 DeRay Mckesson
 Deval Patrick
 Donny Deutsch
 Ed O'Keefe
 Ed Rendell
 Eleanor Clift
 Eleanor Holmes Norton
 Eric Adams
 Eric Swalwell
 Eugene Robinson
 Ezekiel Emanuel
 Fareed Zakaria
 Frank Rich
 Frank Luntz
 George R. R. Martin
 George Will
 Gregory Meeks
 Gretchen Whitmer
 Grover Norquist
 Harry Reid
 H. R. McMaster
 Hillary Rosen
 Howard Fineman
 Huma Abedin
 Ian Bremmer
 Ibram X. Kendi
 Ijeoma Oluo
 Ike Barinholtz
 Jaime Harrison
 Jamaal Bowman
 James Carville
 Jared Polis
 Jeff Daniels
 Jeff Merkley
 Jeh Johnson
 Jemele Hill
 Jennifer Palmieri
 Jennifer Rubin
 Jessica Yellin
 Jim Sciutto
 Jimmy Gomez
 Joe Arpaio
 John Brennan
 John Dickerson
 John F. Harris
 John Heilemann
 John Hickenlooper
 Jon Meacham
 Jonathan Capehart
 Jonathan Lemire
 Jorge Ramos
 Judy Chu
 Judy Woodruff
 Julian Castro
 Justin Jackson
 Kal Penn
 Kara Swisher
 Karen Bass
 Katie Porter
 Katty Kay
 Ken Burns
 Kirsten Gillibrand
 Lauren Underwood
 Larry Sabato
 Lawrence O'Donnell
 Lawrence Wright
 Linda Sánchez
 Major Garrett
 Malcolm Gladwell
 Marc Lamont Hill
 Marc Veasey
 Margaret Hoover
 Mark Cuban
 Mark Hamill
 Mark Takano
 Matt Bai
 Matt Schlapp
 Maxwell Frost
 Mazie Hirono
 Mehdi Hasan
 Michael Bennett
 Michael Beschloss
 Michael Cohen
 Michael Isikoff
 Michael Lewis
 Mike Levin
 Molly Ball
 Nate Silver
 Neera Tanden
 Nicholas Kristof
 Nikki Glaser
 Nikole Hannah-Jones
 Nicole Perlroth
 Nina Turner
 Norman Lear
 Olivia Nuzzi
 Orna Guralnik
 P. J. O'Rourke
 Padma Lakshmi
 Patrick Radden Keefe
 Paul Krugman
 Pete Buttigieg
 Pete Souza
 Peter Bergen
 Phil Murphy
 Philip Rucker
 Pramila Jayapal
 Preet Bharara
 Rainn Wilson
 Raja Krishnamoorthi
 Randi Weingarten
 Raul Ruiz
 Reza Aslan
 Richard N. Haass
 Richard Wolffe
 Rick Gates
 Rick Klein
 Rick Tyler
 Rick Wilson
 Ritchie Torres
 Ro Khanna
 Rob Reiner
 Robert Draper
 Robert Reich
 Ronan Farrow
 Rosa DeLauro
 Ross Douthat
 Ruben Gallego
 Rush Limbaugh
 Salman Rushdie
 Samantha Power
 Sarah McBride
 Sebastian Junger
 Shannon Watts
 Sheldon Whitehouse
 Sheryl Lee Ralph
 Stanley A. McChrystal
 Steven Clemons
 Steven Rattner
 Susan Page
 Symone D. Sanders
 Tara Palmeri
 Thomas Friedman
 Tiffany Cross
 Tig Notaro
 Tina Smith
 Tony Cárdenas
 Touré
 Vivek Murthy
 Walter Isaacson
 Wesley Clark
 Weijia Jiang
 Wes Moore
 William Barber II
 Willie Geist
 Yamiche Alcindor
 Ziwe Fumudoh

References

External links
Official Site for Seasons 1–2
Official Site for Season 3

2020 American television series debuts
2020s American adult animated television series
2020s American late-night television series
2020s American political comedy television series
2020s American satirical television series
2020s American television news shows
2020s American variety television series
American adult animated comedy television series
American adult animated web series
American animated variety television series
American flash adult animated television series
American news parodies
Animated satirical television series
American television series with live action and animation
Comedy Central animated television series
Comedy Central late-night programming
Criticism of journalism
English-language television shows
Paramount+ original programming
Political satirical television series
Stephen Colbert
The Late Show with Stephen Colbert
Television series about journalism
Television series about television
Television series by CBS Studios
Television series by CBS Eye Animation Productions
Television series impacted by the COVID-19 pandemic